The 2020 I-League Qualifiers (also known as Hero I-League Qualifiers 2020 for sponsorship reasons) was the 13th season of I-League 2nd Division, the second division of Indian football league, since its establishment in 2008. The league was kicked-off from 25 January 2020.

The season was shortened due to COVID-19 pandemic in India and Mohammedan won the league, being promoted to 2020–21 I-League.

Teams 
This season, 17 teams participated, including one reserve side from I-League (Punjab) and eight from Indian Super League (ATK, Jamshedpur, Hyderabad, Bengaluru, Chennaiyin, Mumbai City, Goa and Kerala Blasters). All the teams had been divided into three groups of six teams in A and C, and five teams in group B. The teams which made their debut this season were Bengaluru United, Rajasthan FC, Punjab FC (reserves), Hyderabad FC (reserves) and Mumbai City FC (reserves). Indian Arrows reserves were supposed to debut this season, but later withdrew, since it consists of U-16 and U-18 players, which had their board examinations.

Stadiums and locations 
	

Due to COVID-19 pandemic, all the rescheduled matches after COVID-19 pandemic, will be played in a single venue. AIFF declared Kolkata and Kalyani as the venue on 14 August for the final round after cancelling the remaining matches of the preliminary round. Matches will be played at Kalyani Stadium in Kalyani and at Salt Lake Stadium in Kolkata.

Personnel and kits

Coaching changes

Foreign players 
Each club, excluding the reserve sides, can register three foreign players in their squad. One of the foreign players has to be from an AFC Member Nation.

Preliminary round

Group A

Results

Fixtures and results

Group B

Results

Fixtures and results

Group C

Results

Fixtures and results

I-League Qualifiers 
Due to the COVID-19 pandemic in India, usual final round format was scrapped off. It was decided that the final round of the league will be rescheduled into a new format and all the non-reserve teams from the preliminary stage will automatically progress to this round. It was officially named as I-League Qualifiers. The teams in this round will play in a round-robin format in two venues, at Salt Lake Stadium in Kolkata and Kalyani Stadium in Kalyani, near Kolkata. The team with highest points would advance to the 2020–21 I-League. Out of the eight non-reserve teams, FC Kerala, Lonestar Kashmir FC and Rajasthan FC pulled out from tournament due to financial and other constraints.

Final round

Results

Fixtures and results

Season statistics

Top scorers

Hat-tricks

Cleansheets

Average home attendances

References

External links 
 https://i-league.org/category/2nd-division-league/
 https://www.the-aiff.com/competitions/second-division

I-League 2nd Division seasons
I-League 2nd Division
Association football events curtailed due to the COVID-19 pandemic